Randall & Hopkirk (Deceased) is a British television series, produced by Working Title Television for BBC One, written and produced by Charlie Higson. It is a revival of the 1960s television series Randall and Hopkirk (Deceased) and stars Vic Reeves as Marty Hopkirk and Bob Mortimer as Jeff Randall, two partner private detectives, Emilia Fox as Jeannie Hurst, Hopkirk's fiancée, and Tom Baker as Wyvern, a spirit mentor. Two series were commissioned and were broadcast in 2000 and 2001 with the pilot episode airing 18 March 2000.

In keeping with the original series, in the initial episode Hopkirk is murdered during an investigation and returns to Earth as a ghost tied to his partner Randall. Randall is the only living main character who is able to see him (though occasionally other characters can). The remake paid much more attention to where Hopkirk went when he was not on Earth than the original and introduced Limbo, a place where he could meet other ghosts. It also introduced the character Wyvern, a mentor who helps Hopkirk hone his powers, introduces him to other ghosts, and is terrible at poetry. The remake also made Jeannie a more central character than the original and changed her status to Hopkirk's fiancée, rather than widow, allowing for a love-triangle element between the three main characters to form.

Background
Two series were made, the first in 1999 (broadcast in 2000) and the second in 2001. The show was produced by Charlie Higson, who also directed some episodes. Writers for the series include Gareth Roberts, Mark Gatiss and Jeremy Dyson, Paul Whitehouse, and Higson. When the rights to the series were first obtained by WTTV, Simon Wright, the company's executive producer and president, envisaged the series as a straight thriller, but this changed after he suggested casting a comedian as Marty Hopkirk with Robbie Coltrane and Rik Mayall originally considered for the role. After discovering that the rights had been bought by WTTV, Reeves and Mortimer showed a strong interest in the two lead roles. After being offered the roles, the pair suggested Charlie Higson as writer.

Mortimer was initially to play Marty Hopkirk, to echo the physical characteristics of the original actors, but this was changed as Higson felt that Reeves' "manic energy" better suited Hopkirk's personality and situation. Reeves and Mortimer are both fans of the original series, with Reeves citing Hopkirk as the inspiration behind his all-white outfit in the pilot episode of Vic Reeves Big Night Out.

Reeves, Mortimer and Higson's connections helped to draw in many cameos and guest stars from the comedy world and beyond, to play bit parts or larger roles in individual episodes. Guest stars include Hugh Laurie, Derek Jacobi, Simon Pegg, Mark Gatiss, Charles Dance, Matt Lucas, David Walliams, Reece Shearsmith, and Martin Clunes. Higson himself cameos in every episode, twice as characters who appear in more than one: these were Gomez the Limbo barman in "A Blast from the Past" and "Marshall and Snellgrove" and civil servant Bulstrode in "Paranoia" and "Pain Killers".

Many episodes include story lines or mentions that pay homage to the original series. In the fifth episode of series one, a clip of Mike Pratt - who played Jeff Randall in the original series and had died before the new series was created - was used, from the episode "The Smile Behind the Veil". Kenneth Cope, who played the original Marty Hopkirk, was asked to cameo, but declined. Place names also paid homage to the original series: Spooner Drive  and Berman Street - after creator Dennis Spooner and producer Monty Berman - are used in the first episode of series one; and Cope House - after Kenneth Cope - is the name of the building where the duo's office is based.

Episode list

Series 1

Series 2

Soundtrack
A soundtrack album to the series was released by Island Records in 2000. The show's theme, which plays over the opening titles of the series, was written by David Arnold but was not included on the soundtrack album.

Incidental music for the show was written by Murray Gold who also wrote various stings and pieces based on Arnold's theme. An original song, "My Body May Die", was written for the show by Pulp and featured The Swingle Sisters. This song became associated with Marty's character when he was onscreen.

A vocal version of the theme sung by Nina Persson of The Cardigans was also released in 2000 and featured in the episode "Revenge of the Bog People". The vocal version was originally written as a duet, with Reeves to sing with Persson. While not featuring on the final theme, a bonus track sung by Reeves was included on the single, a cover of "Ain't That A Kick in the Head". The extended instrumental of Arnold's theme was also included as a B-side on the single.

Books
A tie-in book Randall and Hopkirk (Deceased): the files was released after the second series, written by Andy Lane with an introduction by Charlie Higson.

Two novelisations of the series were also released, Ghosts from the Past, written by Graeme Grant and Ghost in the Machine by Andy Lane. Both were published by Macmillan Publishers.

See also
 List of ghost films

References

External links
 
 Interview with Charlie Higson about the series

British supernatural television shows
Ghosts in television
BBC television dramas
2000 British television series debuts
2001 British television series endings
2000s British drama television series
2000s British mystery television series
Television series by Universal Television
Television series by Working Title Television
British detective television series
Television shows about spirit possession
English-language television shows
British fantasy television series